Hamlet's Dresser is a memoir by Bob Smith.  It was first published in 2002.

The title derives from the author's work as a dresser for a production of Hamlet at the American Shakespeare Theatre in Stratford, Connecticut.

Author 

Robert W. Smith was born on July 10, 1941.

Reception 

Hamlet's Dresser was a Wall Street Journal editor's pick, a Barnes & Noble top choice, and a Book of the Month Club selection.

See also 

 2002 in literature
 Shakespeare in performance

References

External links 

 Simon & Schuster, Hamlet's Dresser, Book by Bob Smith, Official Publisher Page

 Salvation by Shakespeare: Hamlet's Dresser by Bob Smith

American memoirs
William Shakespeare
Writers from Connecticut